Mike Leon Grosch (born 2 November 1976) is a German singer who came to fame as the runner-up of the third season of the television show Deutschland sucht den SuperStar, the German version of Pop Idol.

Biography
Grosch was born in Wuppertal, North Rhine-Westphalia to a German-Australian father and Korean mother. He later moved to Cologne with his single mother Sung-Yun, who worked as a nurse there. He gained his first professional stage experience when he started singing at weddings and other ceremonies, while simultaneously performing with his own band.

Until autumn 2005, Grosch worked as a cell phone seller. At that time he took leave from his job to participate in the third season of Deutschland sucht den SuperStar (where he also became romantically involved with co-competitor Vanessa Jean Dedmon). Because of his strong, husky voice and a few similarities to British singer Seal, Grosch became an early favourite with the judges and the audience, who enabled him to sing against competitor Tobias Regner during the final show. However, Grosch lost by vote, scoring 45% against Regner.

Grosch released a second single, "Confessional", from his album Absolute to minor success. He also joined Regner for a summer tour around (Germany) which was called Absolute Straight.

In early March 2007, Grosch admitted to Bild, the biggest German daily tabloid, that SonyBMG would not continue their existing record contract with him and thus was being dropped. He also stated that so far no other record label had showed interest in working with him.

Discography

Albums
 Absolute (2006) #2 in Germany

Singles

References

External links
Official website (archived)

1976 births
Living people
Deutschland sucht den Superstar participants
21st-century German male singers
German people of Korean descent
German people of Australian descent
19 Recordings artists